Surfside 6 is an ABC television series which aired from 1960 to 1962. The show centered on a Miami Beach detective agency set on a houseboat and featured Troy Donahue as Sandy Winfield II; Van Williams as Kenny Madison (a character recycled from Bourbon Street Beat); and Lee Patterson as Dave Thorne. Diane McBain co-starred as socialite Daphne Dutton, whose yacht was berthed next to their houseboat. Spanish actress Margarita Sierra also had a supporting role as Cha Cha O'Brien, an entertainer who worked at the Boom Boom Room, a popular Miami Beach hangout at the Fontainebleau Hotel, directly across the street from Surfside 6.

Surfside 6 was in fact a real address in Miami Beach, where an unrelated houseboat was moored at the time; it can also be seen in the sweeping aerial establishing shot of the Fontainebleau in 1964's Goldfinger.

Description

Surfside 6 was one of four detective TV series produced by Warner Bros. around that time, the others being 77 Sunset Strip (set in Los Angeles), Hawaiian Eye (set in Hawaii), and the aforementioned Bourbon Street Beat (set in New Orleans). Plots, scripts (changing the names and locales), characters, and almost everything else crossed over from one series to another, not a difficult feat since they were all actually shot on the studio's backlots in Los Angeles.

Surfside 6 had a memorable theme song, written by Jerry Livingston and Mack David. The theme has often been parodied in popular culture. The lyrics varied from week to week, but "Surfside 6" and "In Miami Beach!" stayed intact. When the women were introduced, the melody picked up with back-up singers singing "Cha Cha Cha" when the announcer introduced Margarita Sierra, who vamped exaggeratedly and winked at the camera during this brief weekly sequence.

In its first season, Surfside 6 was aired opposite the CBS sitcoms Bringing Up Buddy and The Danny Thomas Show and NBC's Western Tales of Wells Fargo starring Dale Robertson. In the second year, Surfside 6 competed against Danny Thomas and The Andy Griffith Show on CBS and NBC's short-lived, but highly acclaimed 87th Precinct starring Robert Lansing, a series about a fictitious New York City police precinct.

Episodes

Cast and Characters
Troy Donahue as Sandy Winfield II. Sandy moved to Miami to escape the shadow of his father, Jonathan Winfield I, who wanted him to be a Wall Street attorney. His father pays for Sandy's room and board at the Racquet Club in Miami Beach. At first Sandy was not part of the firm, but he was friends with Kenny and Dave and he eventually joined their business. 
Van Williams as Kenny Madison. Kenny graduated from law school and worked as a private investigator in New Orleans, in Bourbon Street Beat. He then moved to Miami.
Lee Patterson as Dave Thorne. Dave served in the Air Force in the Korean War and worked in the New York District Attorney's office before moving to Miami.  
Diane McBain as Daphne Dutton. She is a socialite who has the berth next to the SurfSide houseboat for her yacht, the Daffy II. 
Margarita Sierra as Cha Cha O'Brien. A featured performer at the Boom Boom Room, across the road from where the boys live. 
Mousie Garner as Mousie

Background

The series was announced in April 1960 as a replacement for Bourbon Street Beat. One paper described it as like "replacing a violin with a fiddle". It was given a Monday night slot at 8:30.

In June it was given a timeslot of Monday 8.30 pm

Reception
According to one critic Surfside 6 "was one of TV's weakest shows. For the most part poorly written and not exactly endorsed by the Actors Studio. But the teenagers loved it." The Los Angeles Times called it "inept".

The show managed to be renewed for a second season.

By April 1962 the show was cancelled.

Follow-up

After the show was cancelled, Troy Donahue moved over to the cast of Hawaiian Eye to replace Anthony Eisley. Donahue played hotel social director Philip Barton.

Also, a book was released, Surfside 6 by Jay Flynn (US, Dell 8388, October 1962).

Margaret Sierra died in 1963 of a congenital heart condition.

Four years later, in 1966, Van Williams went on to his own short-lived TV series (which later became a cult classic), The Green Hornet, which co-starred Bruce Lee.

The houseboat was damaged in 1964, when Hurricane Cleo hit Miami.

References

External links

Surfside 6 at Thrilling Detective website
Surfside 6 at Classic TV Hits website
 

1960 American television series debuts
1962 American television series endings
1960s American crime television series
American Broadcasting Company original programming
Black-and-white American television shows
American detective television series
Television series by Warner Bros. Television Studios
Television shows set in Miami